Learchis poica is a species of sea slug, specifically an aeolid nudibranch. It is a marine gastropod mollusc in the family Facelinidae.

Distribution
This species was described from the East coast of Virginia Key, Miami, Florida. It has been reported from Jamaica, the Bahamas, Barbados and Ghana.

References

Facelinidae
Gastropods described in 1960